Pierre Laurent (born 13 December 1970) is a former professional footballer who played as a forward.

Club career
Born in Tulle, France, Laurent started his career at ESA Brive. He then spent three-and-a-half years at Bastia before transferring to English Premiership Leeds United. He only made four appearances (two as a substitute) in one calendar year before returning to Bastia. After a short spell at Strasbourg which ended with him on the fringes of the first team, he retired in 2003.

References

1970 births
Living people
People from Tulle
Sportspeople from Corrèze
French footballers
Footballers from Nouvelle-Aquitaine
Association football forwards
Ligue 1 players
Premier League players
ESA Brive players
SC Bastia players
Leeds United F.C. players
RC Strasbourg Alsace players
French expatriate footballers
French expatriate sportspeople in England
Expatriate footballers in England